The Ferrari GG50 is a concept car created by Ferrari to mark the fifty years during which Giorgetto Giugiaro had been designing cars. It was introduced at the 2005 Tokyo Motor Show.

Engine and performance

The Ferrari F1 GG50 has special modifications inspired by Formula 1 (F1), to improve performance. It uses a 65 degree V12 naturally aspirated petrol engine. The compression ratio is 11.2:1. The GG50 uses a sequential mode automatic transmission.

Design
The GG50 is a 2+2 coupé "supercar". Most of the elements of the interior design are from the similar Ferrari 612 Scaglietti, as well as part of the exterior design. The exterior body is around four inches shorter and has a differently shaped nose. Some cues, such as the steering wheel, derive from Ferrari's F1 vehicles of the past. Unique parts of the GG50 are its dashboard and the fact that the GG50 uses the Pioneer AVIC–X1R satellite navigation system.

References

External links 

Tokyo Motor Show 2005 Highlights (Ferrari GG50 seen on page)
Ferrari GG50 Information from ConceptCarz.com

GG50